"Moaner" is a song by Underworld, first appearing in 1997 on the Batman & Robin soundtrack. It was also commercially released as a single in Germany and Japan, with promo-only releases being made available in the UK and US. Sales of the imported German release were sufficient for a UK Singles Chart entry, peaking at #89. The 7:37 "long version" (which is actually shorter than the album version) was later added as the last track on the group's 1999 album Beaucoup Fish.

The song's bassline was ranked by Stylus Magazine at number 27 in their list of the "Top 50 Basslines of All Time". However, the same article mentions lyrics which are in fact the lyrics to the track "Push Upstairs". It might be this track that they are actually referring to.

Track listings

Four track commercial releases
12": Warner / 9362 43917-0 (Germany)
CD: Warner / 9362 43905-2 (Germany)
CD: WEA / WPCR-1472 (Japan)
 "Moaner" (short version) – 4:08 (Hyde/Smith/Emerson)
 "Moaner" (album version) – 10:18 (Hyde/Smith/Emerson)
 "Moaner" (Relentless Legs Remix) – 10:04 (Remixed by Hyde/Smith/Emerson)
 "Moaner" (long version) – 7:37 (Hyde/Smith/Emerson)

Three track promotional releases
12": Warner / PRO-A-8976 (USA)
CD: Warner / PRO-CD-8976 (USA)
CD: Warner / PRCD 754 (Germany)
 "Moaner" (long version) – 7:37
 "Moaner" (short version) – 4:08
 "Moaner" (Relentless Legs Remix) – 10:04

Appearances
 The "long version" appears on the album Beaucoup Fish, less a short cut-up intro only available on the single.
 The "album version" appears on the Batman & Robin soundtrack, and on the compilations 1992–2002 and 1992–2012 The Anthology. On the former, the song omits the fade-out and ends abruptly instead.

Charts

References

External links
 Underworld discography pages at dirty.org
 Underworldlive.com

Underworld (band) songs
1997 singles
Batman music
Batman (1989 film series)
TVT Records singles
1997 songs
Wax Trax! Records singles
Songs written by Darren Emerson
Songs written by Rick Smith (musician)
Songs written by Karl Hyde